Krishna Iyer (born 20 March) is a Tamil cinema Indian playback singer from Chennai, India who performs Tamil, Hindi, and Telugu songs. His rendition of "En Uchi Mandaila" from the Illayathalapathi film Vettaikaran, composed by Vijay Antony and starring Vijay, topped the music charts for many weeks in 2009. His first entry into the Tamil music industry was through the movie Kanthaswamy, starring Chiyaan Vikram. Krishna rendered the rap portion of the song "En Peru Meenakumari," scored by Devi Sri Prasad. He has several  night shows and TV programs to his credit. Krishna Iyer has performed in several live shows internationally. His most recent singing credits include Harris Jayaraj's "Google Google" from Thuppakki, which he sang along with actor Vijay. In 2013, "Yaelae Yaelae Dosthu Da" for Harris Jayaraj, from the movie Endrendrum Punnagai, topped the iTunes India chart. He has worked with music directors Vijay Antony, Harris Jayaraj, Gv Prakash, Prasan Praveen Shyam, Selvanagesh, Shankar Mahadevan, Drummer Sivamani, Gopi Sundar, and Devi Sri Prasad.

Discography

References

External links
 http://www.raaga.com/channels/tamil/album/T0002013.html
 http://www.dishant.com/album/Vettaikaaran.html

Tamil singers
Living people
Telugu playback singers
Tamil playback singers
Kannada playback singers
Indian male playback singers
1985 births
Musicians from Chennai